Rooplo Kolhi Resort is a resort in Nagarparkar, Sindh, Pakistan, owned by the Sindh Tourism Development Corporation situated at Islamkot Nagarparkar Road. The resort has a total 18 airconditioned, non-airconditioned, and single rooms.

About the name
Rooplo Kolhi was a freedom fighter, who fought for the rights of Sindhi people and Karoonjhar Mountains against the British Raj. Sindh Minister for Culture, Tourism & Antiquities, Syed Sardar Ali Shah passed a bill in Provincial Assembly of Sindh and initiated the resort establishment on the hero of the Sindhi people.

Establishment
Rooplo Kolhi Resort is established by Sindh Tourism Development Corporation and inaugurated on 26 August 2017.

Location
Resort is situated near Nagarparkar on Islamkot Nagarparkar Road, Sindh, Pakistan.

Tourist attractions
Rooplo Kolhi Resort is surrounded by Karoonjhar Mountains and ancient heritage like old temples, mosques. Nagarparkar is a hub of cultural tourism with a variety of traditional dresses, Thari dance and music. Rain brings here greenery on deserts and mountains. Historical Jain temples which are centuries old can be visited.

References

External links
 STDC portal of Rooplo Kolhi resort

2017 establishments in Pakistan
Hotels established in 2017
Sindh Tourism Development Corporation Resorts